, , or  is a fjord in Troms og Finnmark county, Norway. It is located mostly in Nordreisa Municipality (with very small portions of the fjord in Kvænangen and Skjervøy municipalities). The villages of Storslett and Sørkjosen are both located along the southern shore of the fjord. The European route E06 highway runs along the shore of the inner part of the fjord.

See also
 List of Norwegian fjords

References

Fjords of Troms og Finnmark
Nordreisa
Kvænangen
Skjervøy